Vincetoxicum auriculatum, synonym Cynanchum auriculatum, is a species of climbing vine. Its Chinese name is niu pi xiao [ 牛皮消 ] (leather eater). V. auriculatum flowers between June and August; fruiting from August all the way to December.

Distribution and habitat
Vincetoxicum auriculatum is native to Asian temperate and tropical regions; found in China (in Sichuan, Xizang, and Yunnan provinces), Bhutan, Nepal, and the northern parts of Pakistan and India (it is also native to Kashmir). Its habitat is mountainous shrubland terrain, at elevations from 2800 to 3600 meters.

Studies
Ethanol extracts derived from roots of V. auriculatum are being studied for use in anti-cancer medicine; one preliminary study found extracts to have some cytotoxic effects on certain human tumor cell lines. The tests were conducted, both in vitro and in vivo, on both human subjects, and mice.

References

External links
A photo of C. auriculatum, from Flora of China, courtesy of the Harvard University Herbaria

auriculatum
Plants described in 1834
Flora of Asia